Viola, West Virginia may refer to:

Viola, Marion County, West Virginia, an unincorporated community
Viola, Marshall County, West Virginia, an unincorporated community